Jean-Patrick Abouna Ndzana (born 27 September 1990) is a Cameroonian international footballer who plays as a full back for Swiss club FC Grand-Saconnex.

Club career
Abouna spent his early career in Cameroon for Authentique de Douala and Astres. He left Cameroon for Congolese side Léopards de Dolisie in December 2013. He signed for Belarusian club Neman Grodno in 2017.

Abouna joined Swiss club Olympique de Genève ahead of the 2019–20 season, and Grand-Saconnex later that season.

International career
Abouna made his senior debut for the Cameroon national team in 2010.

References

1990 births
Living people
Footballers from Douala
Cameroonian footballers
Cameroon international footballers
Association football defenders
Cameroonian expatriate footballers
Cameroonian expatriate sportspeople in the Republic of the Congo
Expatriate footballers in the Republic of the Congo
Cameroonian expatriate sportspeople in Belarus
Expatriate footballers in Belarus
Cameroonian expatriate sportspeople in Switzerland
Expatriate footballers in Switzerland
Les Astres players
AC Léopards players
FC Neman Grodno players
Belarusian Premier League players
Cameroon A' international footballers
2011 African Nations Championship players